Gracia Cielo "Grace" Magno Padaca (born October 25, 1963)  is a Filipino politician and former broadcaster who has been the governor of the northern Luzon province of Isabela, Philippines from 2004 until 2010.  She is also the recipient of the Ramon Magsaysay Award for Public Service in 2008.

During her childhood, she survived polio; she has walked with crutches for most of her life.

Biography
Padaca ran for Congress in 2001 where she lost to Faustino "Bojie" Dy, by a margin of 1,285 votes (he got 50.7 percent of the vote to her 49.3 percent). She protested the results of 151 ballot boxes. Dy countered, questioning the results not only of the 151 precincts but all 812 precincts. Padaca initiated what she called an "Adopt A Ballot Box" campaign to raise funds to cover the cost of a ballot box revision. After two and a half years, the House of Representatives Electoral Tribunal (HRET), in a decision promulgated on December 18, 2003, declared Dy the winner by 48 votes. The majority of the HRET refused to count ballots with "Grace" written on them in favor of Grace Padaca.

Padaca won the 2004 gubernatorial election in the northern Luzon province of Isabela with 55% of the vote.

On December 5, 2007, United States Ambassador Kristie Kenney personally conferred to Padaca the International Women of Courage Award, an award which was also conferred to former U.S. Secretary of State Condoleezza Rice. It was bestowed on Padaca for her continued development of Isabela.

Padaca, 44, on July 31, 2008, was among the eight winners of the 2008 Ramon Magsaysay Award, for Government Service for "empowering Isabela voters to reclaim their democratic right to elect leaders of their own choosing, and to contribute as full partners in their own development."

Padaca campaigned against illegal logging problems. Padaca reactivated the anti-illegal task force.

Padaca, Eddie Panlilio (of Pampanga), Naga Mayor Jesse Robredo, and Mayor Sonia Lorenzo of San Isidro, Nueva Ecija, launched "Kaya Natin", a group that "seeks to recruit principled local government officials to change the country's deteriorating political situation." Their 'Islands of Hope' - university campus tour, a movement for ethical leadership and good governance was launched on July 31, 2008, at the Ateneo de Manila University's Walter Hogan Conference Center in Quezon City.

In the 2010 election Padaca was defeated by three-term congressman Bojie Dy of the 3rd district of Isabela with a margin of 3,438 votes.

Notes

References
 The Economist, "Limping Forward" vol. 374 no. 8418 p. 47

Living people
1963 births
Governors of Isabela (province)
Lyceum of the Philippines University alumni
Women provincial governors of the Philippines
Independent politicians in the Philippines
Liberal Party (Philippines) politicians
People from Isabela (province)
Filipino radio personalities
People with polio
Benigno Aquino III administration personnel
Commissioners of constitutional commissions of the Philippines